Levre is a district in the municipality of Bærum, Norway. Its population as of 2007 was 5,368.

It is served by the rail station Gjettum on the Kolsås Line.

References

Villages in Akershus
Bærum